The National Museum of Sudan or Sudan National Museum, abbreviated SNM, is a two-story building, constructed in 1955 and established as national museum in 1971.

The building and its surrounding gardens house the largest and most comprehensive Nubian archaeological collection in the world including objects from the Paleolithic through to the Islamic period, originating from every site of importance in Sudan. A significant catalyst for the museum's creation was the large number of relocated artefacts as a result of the International Campaign to Save the Monuments of Nubia.

In particular it houses collections of these periods of the history of Sudan: Paleolithic, Mesolithic, Neolithic, A-Group culture, C-Group culture, Kerma Culture, Middle Kingdom of Egypt, New Kingdom of Egypt, Napata, Meroë, X-Group culture and medieval Makuria.

The museum is located on Nile Avenue in Khartoum in al-Mugran area, close to the confluence of the White and the Blue Nile.

Collection 
The objects of the museum are displayed in four areas: 
 The Main Hall on the ground floor
 The gallery on the first floor
 The Open Air Museum in the garden
 The Monumental Alley outside the museum building

The ground floor 
Highlights of the collections include:
 The Taharqa statue. A 4-meter high granite statue of Pharaoh Taharqa, penultimate Pharaoh of the 25th Egyptian dynasty, facing the main entrance, welcomes the visitors to the museum. The statue was broken by the Egyptians when they sacked Napata in 591 BCE under the reign of Psamtik II, then buried in a pit by Kushite priests and excavated by George Reisner in 1916.
 Neolithic black-topped red burnished pottery and ram statuettes of the C-Group culture.
 Funerary artefacts and ceramic art dating from the Neolithic, A-group, C-Group, Kerma, and Kushite periods.
 Stela of the chief of Teh-khet Amenemhat, found at Debeira West
 Middle Kingdom of Egypt and New Kingdom of Egypt artefacts from the area of the third cataract like Sai, Soleb, Sedeinga and Kawa.
 A bowlegged figurine of the dwarf goddess Beset with a plump body and strange facial features: She has a large flat nose and a wide mouth framed by a lion mane and round lion ears. Uncommon in Egyptian art, Beset is pictured frontally and full-faced rather than in profile. She appears grasping an undulating snake in her 3-digit left hand indicating to control hostile forces. She is the protector of mothers and new-born children.
 The Napata and Meroë periods of the Kingdom of Kush including the 25th Pharaonic dynasty: Funerary material, a granite statue of king Aspelta, the statue of an unknown Meroitic king, represented as an archer, and artefacts from representative sites like Meroe, Musawwarat es-Sufra and Naqa.

The first floor 
 Wall paintings from the Christian Faras Cathedral dated between the 9th and the 13th century, detached during the UNESCO Salvage Campaign.
 The catalogue of Greek and Coptic inscriptions, produced primarily by the Christian culture of Nubia, was the scholarly contribution of Adam Lajtar from Warsaw University with respect to Greek inscriptions and Jacques Van der Vliet of Leiden University with respect to Coptic inscriptions. These inscriptions were found on Nubian funerary epitaphs found in the Nubian territory in Sudan between Faras in the North and Soba in the South. The texts are inscribed in sandstone, marble or terracotta (36 inscriptions, mostly from Makuria) of generally rectangular shape.

The museum garden

Relocated temples 

In the museum garden are some rebuilt temples and tombs relocated from the submerged area of Lake Nasser.

In 1964, the Aswan High Dam, built across the Nile River in Egypt, created a reservoir in the Nubian area, which extended into Sudan's territory threatening to submerge the ancient temples. During the UNESCO Salvage Campaign the following temples and tombs were re-erected in the museum garden according to the same orientation of their original location, surrounded by an artificial stream of water symbolic of the Nile:
 Some remains of the temple of Ramses II of Aksha dedicated to Amun and to Ramses II himself. Preserved are a part of the Pylon with the Pharaoh worshipping the dynastic god Amun and some side-elements detailing submitted peoples.
 The temple of Hatshepsut of Buhen dedicated to Horus. The falcon-headed Horus, the mythical ancestor of all Pharaohs, and Hatshepsut appearing as a king, never as a woman.
 The temple of Kumma dedicated to the ram-headed Khnum, the god of the Nile cataracts.
 The tomb of the Nubian prince Djehuti-hotep at Debeira
 The temple of Semna dedicated to Dedwen and the deified Sesostris III. The sunk reliefs of this temple were carved over a large period hence the scenes are fragmented.
 The granite columns from the Faras Cathedral

Inscribed rocks 
 Fragments of inscriptions of the submerged Nile-areas inserted onto fake rocks include a Nilometer with the name of queen Sobekneferu. 
 At the banks of the water strip two Meroitic frog statues 60 cm in height from Basa village representing the water-goddess Heket, as well as Beset the protector of pregnant women and newborn babies.

The Tabo colossal statues 
Outside the museum building are set up two granite unfinished colossal statues from the ancient temple of Tabo on Argo Island. As inscriptions are missing, they cannot be assigned to any precise origin, but show Roman stylistic influence.

The Monumental Alley 
The lane leading from the museum car park to the exhibition halls is flanked with Meroitic statues of 2 rams and 6 dark sandstone man-eating lions from Basa village site. The lions are from the first century BCE, as shown by the two cartouches from king Amanikhabale engraved on the first lion on the right.

Archaeology in Sudan 
After decades of excavations by foreign archeological teams in the first half of the 20th century, Sudanese archeologist were gradually trained and included in these excavations and subsequent research. At the end of 2022, The Guardian reported about a new generation of Sudanese archeologists, including a large number of young women. Trained at the Department of Archeology of the University of Khartoum, this new generation represents a growing number of professionals for Sudan’s National Corporation of Antiquities and Museums, who are adding their contemporary perspective on the heritage of Sudan to foreign-led research and studies.

See also
List of museums in Sudan
Nubian Archaeological Expeditions
Sudan Archaeological Research Society

References

Buildings and structures in Khartoum
Museums in Sudan
Sudan
Archaeological museums
Museums established in 1971
Buildings and structures completed in 1955
History of Nubia
1955 establishments in Sudan